Hachi: A Dog's Tale is a 2009 American drama film and a remake of Kaneto Shindo's 1987 Japanese film Hachikō Monogatari. The original film told the true story of the Akita dog named Hachikō who lived in Japan 1923-1935. This version, which places it in a modern American context, was directed by Lasse Hallström, written by Stephen P. Lindsey and Kaneto Shindo, and produced by Richard Gere, Bill Johnson and Vicki Shigekuni Wong. The film stars Gere, Joan Allen, Sarah Roemer, Jason Alexander and Cary-Hiroyuki Tagawa.

Hachi: A Dog's Tale premiered at the Seattle International Film Festival on June 13, 2009, and its first theatrical release was in Japan on August 8, 2009. The film was given a UK theatrical release on March 12, 2010, courtesy of Entertainment Film Distributors, and opened in more than 60 countries throughout 2009 and 2010. By the end of September 2010, the film's foreign box office returns had totalled more than $45 million. Sony Pictures Entertainment decided to forgo a U.S. theatrical release, bringing the film out on DVD on March 9, 2010  and eventually selling it to the Hallmark Channel, where it debuted on September 26, 2010.

Plot 
The film begins with Ronnie narrating to his class that his personal hero is his grandfather Parker Wilson's dog Hachi and the story goes in flashback.

Parker Wilson (played by Richard Gere), a professor who commutes to nearby Providence, Rhode Island, finds a young dog (played by Layla) lost on the railway station platform in Bedridge and temporarily takes it home. (The audience sees that it was freighted by a Japanese monastery and that the tag of its basket was torn in transit.) The dog remains unclaimed but grows close to Parker as he takes it everywhere with him. Parker's Japanese friend Ken tells him that the dog is a breed called Akita and that the character on its collar tag is "Hachi" ("Eight" in Japanese-language). Parker thus gives the name "Hachi" to the dog as it is a lucky number. Parker's wife Cate Wilson (played by Joan Allen) eventually warms to Hachi but he sleeps outside in his own shed. Meanwhile, Parker tries in vain to train Hachi in normal dog things like fetching a ball. Ken explains to him that Akita dogs cannot be trained and that if Hachi fetches the ball, it will be for a special reason. Later, Parker's daughter Andy (played by Sarah Roemer) gets married to Michael (played by Robbie Sublett) and Hachi is in the family marriage photograph. Soon after the marriage, Andy announces that she is pregnant. One spring morning, a grown up Hachi (played by Chico) digs under the fence and follows Parker to the railway station. He refuses to go home and Parker misses the train. He hands him over to Cate and catches the next train. At 5:00pm, he returns from the train and is surprised to find Hachi waiting for him at the railway station. He is even more surprised to learn that he came to the railway station all by himself. A daily routine begins: the two walk to the railway station, Parker leaves from the train, Hachi goes home, and returns at 5:00pm to receive Parker.

However, one winter morning, Hachi behaves strangely at home and then follows Parker to the railway station with the ball. Parker throws the ball towards him and much to his delight, Hachi fetches it for the first time. They play for a while and Parker eventually puts the ball in his pocket and begins to leave. Hachi barks and barks and watches Parker's train leaving. Hours later, while still holding the ball, Parker suffers a fatal stroke in his classroom and collapses; Hachi waits for him at the railway station. At 9:30pm, Michael comes to the railway station and takes Hachi home. From his shed, Hachi watches the family mourning Parker. The next morning, Parker's family members and friends gather for his funeral while Hachi goes to the railway station to wait. Soon, Cate sells the house and moves away and Hachi goes to live with Andy and Michael and their infant son Ronnie. However, Hachi follows the train tracks to Bedridge. Andy and Michael find him and take him back to their house, but Andy ends up realizing that Hachi is pining for Parker and opens the gate for him. Hachi licks her hand and runs back to the Bedridge railway station. Hachi now waits at the railway station everyday for hot-dog seller Jasjeet and the other passers-by feed him. Soon, a reporter writes a story about Hachi and people start sending him money and cards. Ken reads Hachi's news and travels to Bedridge where he speaks to Hachi in Japanese: He too misses his best friend. On Parker's tenth death anniversary, Cate arrives in town to visit his grave where Ken is present too. She is moved to see an elderly Hachi (played by Forrest) still waiting at the railway station for his master. Later, Cate tells a 10-year-old Ronnie a story of Hachi who slowly settles in place. The audience sees flashbacks of Parker and Hachi together and a last passenger pauses at the door of the railway station. It is Parker who shouts "Hachi!" and the dog raises his head, runs to him and they embrace. Hachi lies dead at his place at the railway station while still waiting for Parker and the camera pans up to the night sky.

In the present, Ronnie narrates that his grandfather and Hachi taught him the meaning of "loyalty" which means "you should never forget anyone you have loved". He concludes that Hachi will forever be his personal hero and the class applauds. From the school bus, Ronnie is met by Michael and a tiny new puppy who is also named Hachi. The film ends with Ronnie and the puppy traveling through the same tracks Hachi traveled years ago.

Cast

Main 
 Layla / Chico / Forrest – Hachi Wilson 
 Richard Gere – Professor Parker Wilson 
 Joan Allen – Cate Wilson
 Sarah Roemer - Andy Wilson
 Robbie Collier Sublett - Michael

Supporting 
 Kevin DeCoste - Ronnie whose parents are Michael and Andy
 Erick Avari – Jasjeet, the Indian hot-dog cart vendor
 Jason Alexander – Carl Boilins, the train station master
 Cary-Hiroyuki Tagawa – Ken Fujiyoshi, the Japanese professor who is Parker's friend
 Davenia McFadden – Mary-Ann, the bookstore owner
 Tora Hallström – Heather, one of Ronnie's classmates

Production 
The end credits include a disclaimer warning that "Although beloved by many as a family pet, Akitas are recommended only for dedicated and experienced dog owners," referring viewers to the American Humane Society and the American Kennel Club for more information.

When David Itzkoff wrote about the film in a September 24, 2010, article headlined "Film has Two Big Names and a Dog but No Big Screens", he reported that Sony refused to comment on its decision not to release the picture to theaters in the United States.

The color in scenes filmed from the dog's point of view is desaturated almost to black-and-white. Although there are several scenes from Hachi's POV, the film never puts human dialogue in Hachi's mind/mouth.

Animal trainer Mark Harden and his team trained the three Akitas—Layla, Chico and Forrest—who played the role of Hachi in the movie. Harden adopted Chico after the movie was completed. Trainer David Allsberry adopted Layla after the shoot.  New York Times reporter David Itzkoff repeated Richard Gere's description of the challenging process of getting to know his canine co-stars: There was, Mr. Gere said, "a certain amount of anxiety, of would we get along? They cannot be bought." But after about three days, he said, "One of the dogs came over and put her head right on my lap. And that was a big moment - I was accepted in the pack."The movie was based on the real Japanese Akita dog Hachikō, who was born in Ōdate, Japan, in 1923. After the death of his owner, Ueno Hidesaburō in 1925, Hachikō returned to the Shibuya train station the next day and every day after that for the next nine years until he died in March 1935. A bronze statue of Hachikō is in front of the Shibuya train station in his honor, in the spot where he waited. Hachikō is known in Japanese as chūken Hachikō (忠犬ハチ公) "faithful dog Hachikō", hachi meaning "eight" and kō meaning "affection." The film ends with a text panel summarizing the story of the real Hachikō, a photo of the dog and a shot of the bronze statue. According to the movie's closing cards, the real Hachikō died in March 1934, while the earlier movie, Hachikō Monogatari, and other sources state that his actual death was on March 1935 (9 years and 9 months after Professor Ueno's death).

The majority of filming took place in Bristol, Rhode Island, and Woonsocket, Rhode Island. The only spoken reference to the actual location where filming took place is when the newspaper reporter Teddy states he works for the Woonsocket Call (Woonsocket's daily newspaper).

Additional locations included the University of Rhode Island in Kingston, Rhode Island, along the Providence and Worcester Railroad Mechanical, and the Columbus Theater located in Providence, Rhode Island. A second production unit filmed scenes on-location in Japan. Footage was shot at the (now closed) Reynolds Elementary School in Bristol.

Reception 
In October 2009, Christopher Lloyd of the Sarasota Herald Tribune gave the film 4 out of 5 stars, noting:  "Hachi: A Dog's Tale is unapologetically a tear-jerker. You might resent being emotionally manipulated by this film, but I challenge even the most hard-hearted moviegoer not to spill some saltwater while watching it."

In June 2009, Varietys Alissa Simon described the film as a "Sentimental, repetitive tale... [harking] back to the values, production and otherwise, of an earlier era. [...] It’s family-friendly rather than family fare; kids are likely to be bored stiff. [...] Even so, the dog's silent distress and dignity will move all but the hardest hearts. [The] pic's main problem is that its human story lacks drama; Hachi's the central attraction."

Review aggregator website Rotten Tomatoes reported that 64% of critics have given the film a positive review based on 28 reviews, with an average rating of 5.88/10.

Commemoration

On May 19, 2012, a bronze replica of the original Hachiko statue was placed at the train depot at Woonsocket Depot Square, Woonsocket, Rhode Island, where the movie was filmed. The train depot at One Depot Square was renamed Hachiko Place. The Rhode Island statue's dedication ceremony was part of the Cherry Blossom Festival held in three Rhode Island towns: Pawtucket, Central Falls, and Woonsocket. Dignitaries including the Mayor of Woonsocket and the Consul General of Japan attended the ceremony. Two cherry blossom trees were planted by the statue. A visitor from New Jersey's Akita-mix (also named Hachi) was invited to participate at the ribbon-cutting ceremony as a "real-life stand-in for Hachiko".

The Blackstone Valley Heritage Corridor and the Blackstone Valley Tourism Council have created a handout with useful info for people who want to take a tour of the movie locations for "Hachi".

In commemoration of the daily vigil, a lone statue of Hachiko was erected in front of Shibuya Station in 1934, even while the canine was still alive.

Score 
The film score of Hachi was composed by Jan A. P. Kaczmarek.

Track list 
 "Japan" (03:26)
 "New Home" (01:47)
 "The Foot" (02:40)
 "Dance Rehearsal" (02:15)
 "Storm and the Rescue" (01:36)
 "The Second Dance" (00:51)
 "Under the Fence" (01:51)
 "Treats from Cate" (01:52)
 "Parker's Dance Played on Piano" (03:42)
 "Parker and Hachi Walk to the Station" (02:04)
 "Baby" (01:23)
 "Marriage Bath" (03:27)
 "Fetch" (02:12)
 "To Train Together" (03:25)
 "Packing Boxes" (02:15)
 "Parker and Hachi" (03:28)
 "Hachiko Runs Away" (04:27)
 "Memory of the Storm" (01:36)
 "Hachi Waiting for Parker Again" (02:51)
 "Hachi's Last Trip to the Station" (02:06)
 "Goodbye" (02:10)
 "Hachi, Parker, Cate and Memories" (03:58)
 "Hachi's Voice (Version 1)" (Bonus track) (00:14)
 "Hachi's Voice (Version 2)" (Bonus track) (00:10)
 "Hachi's Voice (Version 3)" (Bonus track) (00:11)
 "Hachi's Voice (Version 4)" (Bonus track) (00:09)

References

External links 
 
Hachi: A Dog's Tale on TCM 
 
 

2009 films
2009 drama films
2000s children's drama films
American drama films
American children's drama films
Films directed by Lasse Hallström
Films scored by Jan A. P. Kaczmarek
American remakes of Japanese films
Films about dogs
Drama films based on actual events
Films about pets
Films set in 1998
Films set in 2008
Films set in Rhode Island
Films set in Japan
Films shot in Rhode Island
Films shot in Japan
Stage 6 Films films
Japan in non-Japanese culture
2000s English-language films
2000s American films